The Men's St. Nicholas round open was one of the events held in Archery at the 1960 Summer Paralympics in Rome.

There were only three competitors, whose full names are not recorded. Each competitor therefore won a medal.

References 

M